Maryla Falk (26 April 1906 in Lviv – 13 June 1980 in Chamonix Mont Blanc) was a Polish indologist and religious scholar. A member of the Polish Oriental Society, she is best remembered for her book Mit psychologiczny w starożytnych Indiach (1939), and her treatises l misteri di Novalis (1938) published in Naples, and Nāma-rūpa and Dharma-rūpa. Origin and Aspects of an Ancient Indian Conception (1943) published at the University of Calcutta.

References 

1906 births
1980 deaths
Indologists
Polish anthropologists